James "Jim" Waterson (born March 1989) is an English journalist who is the media editor of The Guardian and was previously political editor of BuzzFeed UK.

Early life
Waterson was born in York. He graduated from Jesus College, Oxford in 2011, with a degree in History. He represented the college on the 2009–10 series of University Challenge.

Career

Waterson interned at Guido Fawkes, The Independent, and The Observer before his first job covering politics and business on City A.M. While at City A.M. he fried an egg on a street using reflected heat from the 20 Fenchurch Street skyscraper.

He was BuzzFeed News' UK political editor from 2013, before joining The Guardian in 2018.

He has presented Week in Westminster on BBC Radio 4, and appeared on Moral Maze in February 2017.

Personal life
Waterson has been in a relationship with journalist Jess Brammar since 2017. Brammar has been the editor of BBC News and BBC World News since 2021. The couple have one son born in 2020.

References

External links 
 Buzzfeed contributions
 Guardian contributions

Living people
1989 births
Alumni of Jesus College, Oxford
English political journalists
Journalists from Yorkshire
People from York